Timothy Guy Phelps (December 20, 1824 – June 11, 1899) was an American politician, businessman, and government official. He was the first president of the Southern Pacific Railroad from 1865 until 1868 and saw the railroad build its first tracks south of San Francisco, California.

Biography

Early years
Phelps was born in Oxford, New York, and completed preparatory schooling there and then moved to New York City in 1845 where he worked in mercantile for a short time, then returned to Chenango County to study law. As soon as word of the mid-century gold finds in California reached New York, Phelps took a boat to the west coast. He arrived in San Francisco, California, via Panama, on December 14, 1849 and he moved to Tuolumne County, California where he tried his hand at mining. Failing to find a fortune in gold, he moved to San Francisco to resume a career in the mercantile, starting a merchant house in August 1850.

Career
Phelps's business losses were substantial in the great fire of May 1851, but Phelps rebuilt and soon recovered his loss. It was during this period of recovery that he purchased  of land in what is now San Mateo County, California. He used the land for farming and soon decided to make the area, now the city of San Carlos, his home.

Living in San Carlos, in 1851 Phelps became involved in the local vigilance committee in an effort to uphold the law.

Following a failed state assembly bid in 1854, when he ran with Col. E.D. Baker, Phelps was elected to the California State Assembly in 1855 and served until 1857 as the first Republican from San Francisco and San Mateo Counties. During his term, he served on the first Grand Jury on August 1, 1856. He introduced "An Act to reorganize and establish the County of San Mateo" in March 1857.

He then was served in the California State Senate from 1858 to 1861. During the 1859 Republican California state convention, his name was advanced as a potential nominee for governor, but he withdrew in favor of Leland Stanford. In a subsequent 1861 Republican state convention, he ran for the Republican nomination for governor, but was defeated by Stanford, 197 votes to 104. Following the 1861 convention, he was elected to the 37th United States Congress where he served from March 4, 1861 until March 3, 1863. When the San Francisco and San Jose Railroad was built in the 1860s, the right of way from Redwood City to Belmont was granted from Phelps's land.

His next job was in real estate until 1870 when he became the customs collector for the port of San Francisco (until 1872). In 1875, he won the Republican nomination for Governor of California, but he was defeated by the Democratic candidate William Irwin, in part aided by disgruntled Republicans who ran John Bidwell as an independent candidate. In 1888, Phelps ran for Congress again, but was defeated by the Democrat Thomas J. Clunie.

He also served as a regent of the University of California at Berkeley from 1878 until his death.

Personal life
He married Sophronia J. Jewell (born Nov 13, 1824), of Guilford, New York on September 13, 1853.

He died at age 74 on June 11, 1899 near San Carlos, California after he was struck by two boys on a tandem bicycle. The cyclists turned themselves in after learning of his death, and charges against them were dropped on June 20, 1899 after they related their account of the accident.

References

 Biographical Directory of the United States Congress, Phelps, Timothy Guy. Retrieved January 13, 2005.
 San Mateo County Biographies - Timothy Guy Phelps. Retrieved January 13, 2005.

External links

Join California Timothy G. Phelps

1824 births
1899 deaths
American railway entrepreneurs
19th-century American railroad executives
American vigilantes
Southern Pacific Railroad people
People of California in the American Civil War
People from San Carlos, California
Pedestrian road incident deaths
Road incident deaths in California
University of California regents
Republican Party members of the United States House of Representatives from California
19th-century American politicians
Republican Party members of the California State Assembly
Republican Party California state senators
Burials at Cypress Lawn Memorial Park